Woodbrook may refer to:

Places
 Woodbrook, Port of Spain, Trinidad and Tobago
 Woodbrook, Baltimore, a neighborhood in the city of Baltimore, Maryland, that looks over Druid Hill Park
 Woodbrook, County Tyrone, a townland in County Tyrone, Northern Ireland
 Woodbrook, County Wexford, a place in County Wexford, Republic of Ireland
 Woodbrook, Delaware, an unincorporated community in New Castle County, Delaware, United States
 Woodbrook, Virginia, an unincorporated community in Albemarle County, Virginia, United States
 Woodbrook Golf Club, a golf club in Bray, County Wicklow, Republic of Ireland
 Woodbrook House, a house in the parish of Tumna, County Roscommon, Republic of Ireland

Schools
 Woodbrook School, an elementary school in Edison, New Jersey, United States
 Woodbrook Vale School, a secondary school in Loughborough, England

Other
 Cochrane baronets, of Woodbrook, Cavan, Ireland
 Woodbrook (racehorse), Grand National winner in 1881
 Hamilton baronets, of Woodbrook (1814)
 Sir John Hamilton, 1st Baronet, of Woodbrook

See also 
 Woodbrooke Quaker Study Centre